Theory in Practice is a Swedish technical death metal band founded in 1995, which borrows heavily from progressive metal. The band writes technical and complex songs consisting of a lot of time and tempo changes. After a year of rehearsals and gigs, they recorded a demo called Submissive in the Abyss Studio, and three full-length albums after that. In December 2002, the band went on hiatus and began recording again in February 2003.

Discography
 Submissive (demo, 1996)
 Third Eye Function (CD, 1997)
 The Armageddon Theories (CD, 1999)
 Colonizing the Sun (CD, 2002)
 Evolving Transhumanism (single, 2015)
 Crescendo Dezign (EP, 2017)

Members

 Andreas Lyngmo - vocals, lyrics
 Peter Lake - guitar and bass
 Patrik Sjöberg - drums

Former members
 Henrik Ohlsson - vocals, drums, lyrics, songwriting
 Johan Ekman - guitar, vocals (on Third Eye Function)
 Mattias Engstrand - bass, keyboards

External links 
 Official page on Facebook
 Unofficial MySpace Fansite
 Encyclopaedia Metallum's page on the band
 official Peter Lake page on Facebook

Swedish technical death metal musical groups
Musical groups established in 1995
Listenable Records artists